The 3rd South Carolina Regiment was an infantry regiment of the South Carolina Line during the American Revolutionary War. Raised in the western part of South Carolina, the regiment fought in the Siege of Savannah and the Siege of Charleston, surrendering to British forces in the latter.

History 
The regiment was originally designated as the South Carolina Regiment of Horse Rangers and authorized on 6 June 1775 as part of the South Carolina State Troops. It was organized in the following months at Ninety Six among other places and ultimately consisted of nine companies recruited in the western part of the state. The Regiment of Horse Rangers was redesignated as the 3rd South Carolina Regiment on 12 November 1775, and joined the Southern Department of the Continental Army on 24 July 1776. Simultaneously, the Independent Company of Captain Ezekiel Polk was absorbed into the regiment as its 10th Company.

Officers
The regiment had one commander, Lieutenant Colonel/Colonel William Thomson, although Major James Mayson served as the initial highest-ranking member of the regiment.  William Cattell, James Mayson, and William Henderson served as Lieutenant Colonels.  Known Majors include Lewis Golsan, Jr., Hugh Middleton, Thomas Pearman, John Purvis, unknown Speers, and Samuel Wise.  Regimental Adjutants included John Eason, John Knapp, Merry McGuire, and John Purvis.

Engagements
The 3rd South Carolina participated in the First Siege of Charleston in 1775–1776, and became part of the 1st South Carolina Brigade on 23 November. It fought in engagements in the Piedmont and transferred to the 2nd South Carolina Brigade on 26 August 1778. Detachments of the regiment served in the Cherokee War of 1776 and in the expeditions to Florida during 1777 and 1778. The 3rd South Carolina was relieved from the latter on 3 January 1779 and became part of the South Carolina Brigade on 1 February.

The regiment fought in the Siege of Savannah from 16 September 1779 to 18 October 1779 and was reduced back to nine companies on 11 February 1780. Between March and May it participated in the Siege of Charleston, and surrendered to the British Army there on 12 May 1780, together with the rest of the Southern Department. The regiment was disbanded on 1 January 1781.

Known engagements:
 12 July 1775, Fort Charlotte
 18 September 1775, Sullivan's Island
 31 October 1775, Congaree River
 3 November 1775, Mine Creek
 19–21 November 1775, Siege of Ninety-Six
 22 December 1775, Battle of Great Cane Brake
 23–30 December 1775, Snow Campaign
 26 June 1776, Cherokee Indian Towns
 28 June 1776, Battle of Fort Moultrie/Sullivan's Island
 28 June 1776. Breach Inlet Naval Battle
 15 July 1776, Battle of Lindley's Fort
 1 August 1776, Seneca Town
 8–11 August 1776, Cherokee Towns
 10 August 1776, Tugaloo River
 12 August 1776, The Ring Fight
 12 August 1776, Tamassee
 September 1776, St. Augustine Expedition, Florida
 14 October 1776, Altamaha River, Georgia
 23 February – 15 Mar. 1777, Fort McIntosh, Georgia
 29 December 1778, Siege of Savannah, Georgia
 6–10 January 1779, Fort Morris, Georgia
 3 February 1779, Battle of Beaufort/Port Royal Island
 3 March 1779, Battle of Briar/Brier Creek, Georgia
 April - July 1779, Prevost's March
 3 May 1779, Coosawhatchie
 20 June 1779, Battle of Stono Ferry
 16 September – 18 Oct. 1779, Siege of Savannah, Georgia
 12 March 1780, Two Sisters' Ferry
 28 March – 12 May 1780, Siege of Charleston

See also
 South Carolina Line: 1st, 2nd, 4th, 5th, 6th Regiments
 List of South Carolina militia units in the American Revolution

References

 
 
Continental Army Payroll Records, 1779, Book 89, pp. 164ff
Bibliography of the Continental Army in South Carolina compiled by the United States Army Center of Military History

Military units and formations established in 1775
Military units and formations disestablished in 1781
South Carolina regiments of the Continental Army